Pinamungajan, officially the Municipality of Pinamungajan,  is a 2nd class municipality in the province of Cebu, Philippines. According to the 2020 census, it has a population of 75,131 people.

Pinamungajan is bordered to the north by the City of Toledo, to the west is the Tañon Strait, to the east is the city of Naga and the town of San Fernando, and to the south is the town of Aloguinsan.

The municipality, also known as Pinamungahan, was established in the 1815 under the Spanish colonial government in the country. The municipality got its name from the diligent and hardworking people, working hand-in-hand especially during the agricultural harvest season – "Pinamungajan", which originated from the Visayan word pinamuhuan, meant a worker share for his effort during a farm harvest. Over time the Pinamuhuan eventually changed to the current name of the municipality.

The town patroness is Saint Monica, mother of one of the fathers and doctors of the Catholic Church, Saint Augustine of Hippo. However, instead of August 27, Pinamungajan celebrates the memorial of the saint on May 4. In 2008, in response to the call of then governor and now Congresswoman Gwendolyn Garcia for each Cebu town and city to hold a festival as part of local culture and heritage, Pinamungajan began the Pinamuohan Festival in honor of Saint Monica on her memorial.

Geography

Barangays
Pinamungajan comprises 26 barangays:

Climate

Demographics

Economy

Tourism

 Campolabo Sandbar
 Hidden Valley Wave Pool Resort
 Odlom Falls
 Kamangon Cave
 Sinungkulan Falls

Notable personalities
 June Mar Fajardo - 6-time PBA Most Valuable Player (2014 to 2019)

References

External links
 [ Philippine Standard Geographic Code]

Municipalities of Cebu